Saint-Savin is the name of several communes in France:

 Saint-Savin, Gironde
 Saint-Savin, Hautes-Pyrénées
 Saint-Savin, Isère
 Saint-Savin, Vienne, also referred to as Saint-Savin-sur-Gartempe